Yunganastes fraudator is a species of frog in the family Strabomantidae. It is endemic to Bolivia and found in the Cochabamba Department to the border with the Santa Cruz Department. It is sometimes known as Cochamba robber frog. Its specific name fraudator means "cheat" or "deceiver" and refers to its resemblance with Gastrotheca marsupiata.

Description
In a larger series, adult males measure  and adult females  SVL. The snout is rounded. The canthus rostralis is sharp. The supra-tympanic fold is slightly obscuring the upper edge of the tympanum. Neither fingers nor toes have webbing but may have weakly defined lateral fringes. The outer fingers have slightly enlarged tips; only the IV toe has enlarged disc. Dorsal skin is smooth to shagreened with few scattered warts. The dorsum is brown to grey and has dark brown to black longitudinal stripes and black canthal–supra-tympanic and labial stripes.

Habitat and conservation
It is nocturnal and mostly terrestrial, but some individuals can be active in brushwoods, bushes, and ferns, or on the ground during the day.

Yunganastes fraudator is a reasonably common frog although it is locally suffering from habitat loss. Its range overlaps with the Carrasco and Amboró National Parks.

References

fraudator
Amphibians of the Andes
Amphibians of Bolivia
Endemic fauna of Bolivia
Taxa named by John Douglas Lynch
Amphibians described in 1987
Taxonomy articles created by Polbot